Giacomo Rho (1593, Milan – 27 April 1638, Beijing) was an Italian Jesuit missionary in China. There he adopted the Chinese name Luo Yagu (羅雅谷), and was also known by his courtesy name Weishao (味韶).

Life
The son of a jurist, Rho entered the Society of Jesus at the age of twenty. While later proficient in mathematics, he was a poor student initially.

Following his ordination in Rome by Cardinal Bellarmine, he sailed for the Far East in 1617 with forty-four companions. After a brief stay in Goa he proceeded to Macao. During the siege of that city by Dutch forces, he turned the tide of battle by firing a cannon shot which landed on a barrel of gunpowder in the midst of the Dutch formation, saving the city from the attack. This service opened China to him.

Rho rapidly acquired a knowledge of the Chinese language and in 1631 he was summoned to Beijing by the emperor to work on reform of the Chinese calendar. Together with Johann Adam Schall von Bell, he occupied himself on this task until the end of his life seven years later, in 1638. Numerous Chinese officials attended his funeral.

Rho left works relative both to the correction of the Chinese calendar and to other astronomical and theological questions.

He was buried in the Jesuits' Zhalan Cemetery in Beijing.

References

Attribution
 .
 The entry cites:
Augustin de Backer & Carlos Sommervogel, Biblioth. de la Comp. de Jésus, VI (9 vols., Brussels and Paris, 1890–1900), 1709–11; 
Huc, Christianity in China, Tartary and Thibet, II (tr. New York, 1884), 265–66.

1593 births
1638 deaths
17th-century Italian Jesuits
Italian Roman Catholic missionaries
Jesuit missionaries in China
Italian emigrants to China